The Château Clique, or Clique du Château, was a group of wealthy families in Lower Canada in the early 19th century. They were the Lower Canadian equivalent of the Family Compact in Upper Canada. They were also known on the electoral scene as the Parti bureaucrate (Bureaucratic Party, also known as the British Party or the Tory Party).

Like the Family Compact, the Château Clique gained most of its influence after the War of 1812. Most of its families were British merchants, but some were French Canadian seigneurs who felt that their own interests were best served by an affiliation with this group. Some of the most prominent members were brewer John Molson and James McGill, the founder of McGill University. Generally, they wanted the French Canadian majority of Lower Canada to assimilate to English culture. That included the abolition of the seigneurial system, replacing French civil law with British common law, and replacing the established Roman Catholic Church with the Anglican Church. Their efforts led to the Act of Union (1840), which ultimately failed in its attempt to assimilate all French Canadians but succeeded in preventing their political and economic interests from prevailing over those of Britain. The Château Clique also had control over the Crown Lands and the Clergy Reserves but much less than the Family Compact because of the already-existing seigneurial system.

The Constitutional Act of 1791 had established three branches of government: the Legislative Assembly, an elected lower house; the Legislative Council, an appointed upper house; and the Executive Council, which acted as a kind of cabinet for the lieutenant governor. The governor was appointed by the British Crown, and he appointed members of the Clique as his advisers. The Clique was also able to establish itself in the Legislative Council, leaving the Legislative Assembly, made up of a majority of French-Canadian representatives, with little or no power.

Louis-Joseph Papineau, as a reformer in the Assembly, was one of the fiercest opponents of the Château Clique. His struggles against the Clique and the Lieutenant Governor, Lord Gosford, led to the Lower Canada Rebellion in 1837.

After the rebellion, Upper and Lower Canada were united as the Province of Canada, but the Château Clique did not disappear like the Family Compact. While the English-speaking population became the majority, the British-appointed governors still attempted to force the French Canadian population to assimilate. Canada East, as Lower Canada was called after the union, eventually gained some political independence with the union government of Robert Baldwin and Louis-Hippolyte Lafontaine.

Other members

 Jonathan Sewell, member and Speaker of the Legislative Council of Lower Canada
 Jacob Mountain, Archbishop of the Anglican Diocese of Quebec
 William McGillivray, fur trader
 Edward Bowen
 Charles James Stewart, Archbishop of the Anglican Diocese of Quebec
 Horatio Gates, banker
 Peter McGill

See also
History of Quebec
History of Canada
Timeline of Canadian history
Timeline of Quebec history

Political parties in Lower Canada
Lower Canada Rebellion
Political history of Quebec
Anglicanism in Canada